Bibb County Airport  is a county-owned public-use airport in Bibb County, Alabama, United States. According to the FAA's National Plan of Integrated Airport Systems for 2009–2013, it is categorized as a general aviation facility.

Facilities and aircraft 
For the 12-month period ending May 30, 2006, the airport had 3,600 general aviation/military aircraft operations.

References

External links 
 

Airports in Alabama
Transportation buildings and structures in Bibb County, Alabama